Saint Sulien, Sulian, or Silin was the reputed 6th-century founder-abbot of a monastery at Luxulyan in Cornwall. His feast day is 29 July.

There have probably been other Christian Celtic saints with the same (or similar) name, and a variant of it is also used as an alias of Saint Tysilio (see below).

Etymology
Sulien is a Welsh variant of the given name "Julian," but has also been interpreted as being derived from the Welsh sul, meaning "sun" + geni, meaning "born," Sulien being the name of a Celtic solar deity.

Other Saint Suliens
Confusion has arisen between different legends of Celtic saints with the name Sulien (in a variety of spellings). The three most commonly encountered are:

 Saint Sulien (of Cornwall), founder-abbot of Luxulyan monastery, Cornwall – feast day 29 July.
 Saint Sulien (of Brittany) or Saint Sulinus, of Cornouaille and Domnonée, East Brittany –  feast day 1 October.
 Saint Sulien (of Wales) or Saint Tysilio or Saint Suliau, a Welsh prince – feast day 8 November.

The first two, who originate from the Celtic states in broadly similar historical context, may be the same person. However, the fact that separate feast days have been assigned to them from antiquity is strong evidence that they are different people, and that there were in fact three different Celtic saints with the same (or similar) name.

References

Sources
"Saint Sulian: founder of Luxulyan church (?)" in: G. H. Doble, The Saints of Cornwall; part 5: Saints of Mid-Cornwall. Truro: Dean and Chapter, 1970, pp. 104–26

People from Luxulyan
Medieval Cornish saints
6th-century Christian saints